Indian Institute of Rice Research formerly Directorate of Rice Research or IIRR is a rice research institute located in Rajendranagar near Hyderabad, Telangana.

Indian Institute of Rice Research, formerly All India coordinated Rice Improvement Project (AICRIP), was established by the Indian Council of Agricultural Research (ICAR) in 1965 with its national headquarters at Hyderabad to organize and coordinate multi-location testing of genetic lines and technologies for crop production and protection generated across the country. The Project was elevated to Directorate of Rice Research in 1975 with an added mandate of research in the thrust areas of irrigated rice. The Directorate continues its multi-location All India Coordinated Rice Improvement Programme (AICRIP) with active partnership of 47 funded cooperating centers affiliated to State Agricultural Universities (SAUs), State Department of Agriculture and other Research Institutes of ICAR. Besides, over 50 voluntary centers participate in this multi-location testing program. In 2015, IIRR celebrated its 50th year of useful existence for its significant contribution in overall rice production front which has ensured food security for the country.

IIRR mainly coordinates multi-location testing at national level to identify appropriate varietal and management technologies for all the rice ecosystems and conducts various strategic and applied research in the major thrust areas of irrigated rice aimed at enhancement of production, productivity and profitability and at preserving. environmental quality. Also, it initiates and coordinates research networks relating to problems of national and regional importance. IIRR serves  as major centres for exchange of research material and information.

The rate of technology transfer at IIRR has been accelerated through the use of ICTs. Recently, IIRR has developed Rice Knowledge Management Portal that serves as an information highway for rice sector in sharing rice knowledge through latest ICT tools.  Continuous linkages and partnerships are being developed with national, international and private organizations for collaborative research programme. IIRR also offers various consultancy services and undertakes contractual research.

The name of current director at the IIRR is Dr. Raman Meenakshi Sundaram.

History
IIRR was established in 1965 as an All India Coordinated Rice Improvement Project (AICRIP).

References

External links
 Indian Institute of Rice Research
 Directorate of Rice Research

Rice research institutes
Research institutes in Hyderabad, India
Indian Council of Agricultural Research
1965 establishments in Andhra Pradesh
Rice production in India